The 1969 Nippon Professional Baseball season was the 20th season of operation of Nippon Professional Baseball (NPB).

Regular season

Standings

League leaders

Central League

Pacific League

Awards
Most Valuable Player
Sadaharu Oh, Yomiuri Giants (CL)
Tokuji Nagaike, Hankyu Braves (PL)
Rookie of the Year
Koichi Tabuchi, Hanshin Tigers (CL)
Michiyo Arito, Lotte Orions (PL)
Eiji Sawamura Award
Kazumi Takahashi, Yomiuri Giants (CL)

See also
1969 Major League Baseball season

References